José González (30 August 1906 – 31 May 1997) was a Spanish freestyle swimmer. He competed in two events at the 1928 Summer Olympics.

References

External links
 

1906 births
1997 deaths
Spanish male freestyle swimmers
Olympic swimmers of Spain
Swimmers at the 1928 Summer Olympics
Swimmers from Barcelona